Utley may refer to:

People
 Utley (surname)

Places
United Kingdom
 Utley, West Yorkshire, a village in England
United States
 Utley, Ohio
 Utley, Texas
 Utley, Wisconsin
 Utleyville, Colorado

See also 
 Uttley